Edward Lawson VC (11 April 1873 – 2 July 1955) was an English recipient of the Victoria Cross, the highest and most prestigious award for gallantry in the face of the enemy that can be awarded to British and Commonwealth forces.

He was a Private in the 1st Battalion, The Gordon Highlanders, British Army during the Tirah Campaign when the following deed took place on 20 October 1897 on the Dargai Heights, for which he was awarded the VC:

Private Lawson continued to serve with his regiment until 1902. He had a further period of military service serving as a Sergeant in the Northern Cyclist Battalion before and during the First World War.
His Victoria Cross is displayed at the Gordon Highlanders Museum in Aberdeen, Scotland.

There are two memorials to Edward Lawson in Newcastle upon Tyne. The first is a bench dedicated to him in Old Eldon Square by the war memorial. The second is a memorial to Newcastle's Victoria Cross recipients outside the Discovery Museum in the city's west end.

Sometime after The First World War, Edward Lawson lived with his family in Parson's Avenue, Walker, Newcastle upon Tyne, having moved from the Heaton area of Newcastle upon Tyne.

Honours

References

Location of grave and VC medal

1873 births
1955 deaths
Military personnel from Newcastle upon Tyne
British recipients of the Victoria Cross
Gordon Highlanders soldiers
British military personnel of the Tirah campaign
British military personnel of the Chitral Expedition
British Army personnel of the Second Boer War
British Army recipients of the Victoria Cross